Heshmat Fahmi is a member of the Pan-African Parliament and a member of the People's Assembly of Egypt.

External links
The People's Assembly (Egyptian Government Information System)
Members of the Pan-African Parliament

Members of the Pan-African Parliament from Egypt
Members of the House of Representatives (Egypt)
Living people
Year of birth missing (living people)
Place of birth missing (living people)